Apodicarpum is a genus of flowering plants in the family Apiaceae. Its only species is Apodicarpum ikenoi. It is endemic to Japan.

References 

Endemic flora of Japan
Monotypic Apiaceae genera
Apiaceae